National Tertiary Route 755, or just Route 755 (or ) is a National Road Route of Costa Rica, located in the Alajuela, Puntarenas provinces.

Description
In Alajuela province the route covers San Mateo canton (Labrador district).

In Puntarenas province the route covers Esparza canton (Caldera district).

References

Highways in Costa Rica